Inspirational Country Music Association was founded by Gene Higgins and a business partner in 1992 under the name "Christian Country Music Association" but due to a federal lawsuit brought on by the Country Music Association they are no longer permitted to use the Christian Country Music Association acronym.

History
The CCMA was founded in 1992 by Gene Higgins and a business partner. The purpose of the company was to bring exposure to the genre that would become known as Christian country music. Christian country was a form of music that was similar to country but it had positive lyrics and an inspirational and sometimes spiritual content. The organization hosts an annual awards show known as the ICM Awards. The ICM Awards bestows awards upon individuals who perform or promote Christian county music. Higgins announced that on October 4, 2013 he officially retired as the president of the ICM organization. It was further announced that he would remain with the company and participate with running the Power Source Magazine.

Magazine
The ICM has a monthly publication known as "Powersource Magazine" which is a company in itself. The magazine showcases Christian county music artists as well as a playlist music chart. In addition to industry news and the charts, artists may purchase advertisements or be featured as a lead story or an article of interest. These editions are then distributed to industry minded individuals.

ICM awards
The ICM holds an annual awards show to honor artists who participate or promote the genre of Christian country music throughout their careers. Though the awards show does not have a set date for its yearly event, it is usually set between October and November of each year.

Lawsuit
In 2002, the Christian Country Music Association was sued by the Country Music Association for infringement. The CMA contended the CCMA was an infringement upon its brand and that it was in direct competition with the annual Country Music Awards. Ed Benson, the director of the CMA commented that the CCMA was using and benefiting unfairly from the use of the acronym CCMA and it caused confusion for fans and artists alike. The courts finally ruled that the CCMA could use the name "Christian Country Music Association" but would not be permitted to use the acronym CCMA. After the ruling it was decided to rename the CCMA to the Inspirational Country Music Association or the acronym, ICM. In July 2003 the company was reincorporated under its new name. In 2003 the CCMA was once again in violation of the court order banning them from using the CCMA acronym by changing it to CCA. The CMA filed for and was awarded an injunction which prohibited them from using CCA and any of their propaganda.

References

American companies established in 1992
Companies based in Nashville, Tennessee
1992 establishments in Tennessee
American television awards